Deyvison Denílson de Sousa Bessas or Deyvison for short (born 18 October 1988) is a Brazilian professional footballer, who plays as a defender.

External links
 
 

1988 births
Living people
Brazilian footballers
Brazilian expatriate footballers
América Futebol Clube (MG) players
Kartalspor footballers
C.D. Tondela players
C.S. Marítimo players
F.C. Arouca players
Ethnikos Achna FC players
U.D. Vilafranquense players
TFF First League players
Primeira Liga players
Liga Portugal 2 players
Cypriot First Division players
Sportspeople from Minas Gerais
Association football defenders
Brazilian expatriate sportspeople in Turkey
Brazilian expatriate sportspeople in Portugal
Brazilian expatriate sportspeople in Cyprus
Expatriate footballers in Turkey
Expatriate footballers in Portugal
Expatriate footballers in Cyprus